The , also known as Yuan-chia li, was a Japanese lunisolar calendar (genka reki).  It was used from 604 to 680.

History
The calendar was created in 425 during the time of China's Southern and Northern Dynasties.  It is named after (the translation of) the era in Chinese history.

The  Genka-reki system was brought to Japan from Korea by a Buddhist monk. The earliest record of this calendar in Japan is in the 10th month of the 10th year of the reign of Empress Suiko (602), during the Asuka period of Japanese history.

Dates in the Nihon Shoki before the late 7th century were likely recorded using the Genka calendar system.

See also
 Japanese calendar
 Sexagenary cycle

References

Further reading
 Charlotte von Verschuer (1985).  Les relations officielles du Japon avec la Chine aux VIIIe et IXe siècles (Hachi-kyū-seiki no Nitchū kankei), pp. 243-245 n. 114.

External links
 National Diet Library, "The Japanese Calendar"

Specific calendars
7th century in Japan
Time in Japan
History of science and technology in Japan